Daniel David Kriel (born 15 February 1994) is a South African professional rugby union player for the  in Super Rugby and  in the Currie Cup and in the Rugby Challenge. He also plays for the Seattle Seawolves in Major League Rugby (MLR). His regular position is centre. Kriel is the twin brother of professional rugby player Jesse Kriel.

Career

Schools rugby (2010–12)

Kriel attended Maritzburg College in Pietermaritzburg and was selected to represent KwaZulu-Natal at the Under-16 Grant Khomo Week competition in 2010. He missed out on selection for their Under-18 Craven Week two years later after suffering a dislocated shoulder prior to the competition.

Blue Bulls (2013)

After high school, Kriel moved to Pretoria to join the  Academy. He was the first-choice outside centre for the  side in the 2013 Under-19 Provincial Championship, starting eleven of their fourteen matches in the competition. The Blue Bulls topped the log, winning all twelve of their matches during the competition.

Blue Bulls / South Africa Under-20 (2014)

In 2014, Kriel was called up to the South African Under-20 team that participated at the 2014 IRB Junior World Championship in New Zealand. He didn't play in South Africa's first match, a 61–5 victory over Scotland, but he started their second match of the competition, helping South Africa to a 33–24 victory over hosts New Zealand, as well as their final pool match which saw them beat Samoa 21–8 to finish top of their pool. Kriel was named on the bench as South Africa once again met New Zealand in the semi-finals and helped his side to a 32–25 win to qualify for their second ever final. Kriel started the final on the right wing for South Africa as they the match 20–21 to England to finish the competition in second spot.

Kriel made thirteen appearances for the s during the 2014 Under-21 Provincial Championship. For the second year running, he scored two tries in a match against Western Province in a 44–30 win and also got a try in each of their matches against the s. The Blue Bulls U21s finished second on the log to Western Province, but – after beating the s 23–19 in the semi-final – won the final against Western Province in Cape Town, running out 20–10 winners.

Varsity, Vodacom and Currie Cup (2015)

Kriel started the 2015 season by representing university side  in the 2015 Varsity Cup competition. He scored tries in four different matches as UP Tuks topped the log after the round robin stage. He scored his fifth try of the competition in their semi-final match against , but it wasn't enough to prevent the team from Potchefstroom winning the match 29–28 to progress to the final, eliminating UP Tuks. At the conclusion of the competition, Kriel was initially named in a Varsity Cup Dream Team to play a friendly against the South African Under-20s, but was subsequently withdrawn from the squad.

Instead, he was included in the  squad for the 2015 Vodacom Cup competition. He made his domestic first class debut in Windhoek, starting the Blue Bulls' 44–0 victory over Namibian side .

Kriel played two matches for the s in the 2015 Under-21 Provincial Championship Group A before being promoted to the senior squad for the 2015 Currie Cup Premier Division. He was named on the bench for their Round Three match against .

Stormers / Western Province
At the start of 2017, Kriel moved to Cape Town, where he joined the  Super Rugby team and the  Currie Cup team.

Personal
Kriel is the twin brother of Jesse Kriel, both brothers are professional South African rugby players and the great-grandson of John Hodgson (1909-1970), who played 15 games for the British and Irish Lions in the 1930s.

References

South African rugby union players
Living people
1994 births
Rugby union players from Cape Town
Rugby union centres
Rugby union wings
Blue Bulls players
South Africa Under-20 international rugby union players
Bulls (rugby union) players
Stormers players
Western Province (rugby union) players
Lions (United Rugby Championship) players
Golden Lions players
Seattle Seawolves players